USS Little (DD-79/APD-4), a  in the United States Navy during World War I and World War II. She was the first Navy ship named for George Little (1754–1809).

Little was laid down by Fore River Shipbuilding Corporation, Quincy, Massachusetts, 18 June 1917, launched 11 November 1917, sponsored by Mrs. Samuel W. Wakeman, and commissioned 6 April 1918, Commander Joseph K. Taussig in command.

Service history
Little departed Norfolk, Virginia, on 5 May 1918 for convoy escort duty with Patrol Force, Coast of France, and operated from Brest until she sailed for home on 26 December. During this period she escorted President Woodrow Wilson's party to Europe to attend the Paris Peace Conference.

The ship arrived Boston, Massachusetts, on 18 January 1919 for drydock and operations with Destroyer Force, Atlantic. She escorted the president's party back into New York City from 6 to 8 July, and then engaged in tactical exercises, she was transferred to Reserve Status with ComDesRon 3 at Philadelphia, Pennsylvania, on 17 November, where she remained until 4 January 1921. The ship then operated along the Atlantic coast until she returned to Philadelphia and decommissioned 5 July 1922.

Converted to a high-speed transport by having two boilers removed and converted to troop quarters, Little was redesignated APD-4, 2 August 1940, and recommissioned 4 November 1940, Lieutenant Commander K. Earl in command. She sailed for the Caribbean in February 1941 for maneuvers with the U.S. Atlantic Fleet, and then steamed to San Diego, California, where she arrived on 9 March for amphibious training. The ship returned to the east coast in late summer, and arrived at Norfolk on 1 December for drydocking.

As flagship for TransDiv 12, she departed for San Diego on 14 February 1942 for repairs and alterations. Upon completion of amphibious landing exercises in April, she steamed for Pearl Harbor. A short cruise to Midway Island in late June preceded her departure to New Caledonia on 7 July for the Solomons campaign.

Supplies for American troops on Guadalcanal had been badly disrupted by the Battle of Savo Island on 9 August 1942. High-speed destroyer-transports were called upon to remedy this shortage.

On 4 September, Little and Gregory brought a detachment of Marine Raiders to Savo Island on an unfounded rumor that enemy forces had occupied it. The troops were returned to Lunga Point, Guadalcanal. That night was unusually dark, so Division Commander Hugh W. Hadley decided to patrol off Lunga Point rather than attempt to negotiate Tulagi Harbor with no visible landmarks.

About 0100 on 5 September, Little observed gun flashes to the east and believed this to be an enemy submarine. Moments later a Navy PBY Catalina flying over Savo Sound released a string of five flares to illuminate what he also thought was a submarine. The flares illuminated the APDs instead. A surprised Japanese surface destroyer force, engaged in shelling Henderson Field after delivering a "Tokyo Express" shipment of troops and supplies to Guadalcanal and the source of the flashes presumed to have come from a submarine, shifted their guns toward the APDs, and searchlights stabbed through the darkness. Gregory suffered the same fate. The Japanese, to assure their kill, steamed between the two stricken ships firing shells and strafing survivors. Gregory sank stern first about 0140. Little went down on an even keel about two hours later. Fleet Admiral Chester W. Nimitz paid sincere tribute to these gallant ships: "With little means, the ships performed duties vital to the success of the campaign."

Awards
Little received two battle stars for World War II service.

Citations and notes

References
 Lane, Kerry, Guadalcanal Marine, University Press of Mississippi, 2004
 
 Roll of Honor

External links

 Photos 
 NavSource Photos
 Roll of Honor

Wickes-class destroyers
World War I destroyers of the United States
World War II amphibious warfare vessels of the United States
Shipwrecks in Ironbottom Sound
Ships built in Quincy, Massachusetts
1917 ships
Maritime incidents in September 1942